Hannelore Weygand (30 October 1924 – 18 December 2017) was a German equestrian, born in Düsseldorf. She competed in equestrian at the 1956 Summer Olympics in Stockholm, where she won a silver medal in the team competition in mixed dressage (along with Anneliese Küppers and Liselott Linsenhoff).

References

1924 births
2017 deaths
Sportspeople from Düsseldorf
German female equestrians
Equestrians at the 1956 Summer Olympics
Olympic equestrians of the United Team of Germany
Medalists at the 1956 Summer Olympics
Olympic silver medalists for the United Team of Germany
Olympic medalists in equestrian